Shemen afarsimon was a prized oil used in antiquity.  The ancient Jewish community of Ein Gedi was known for its cultivation of the afarsimon.

Balsam and afarsimon in Judaism
The Hebrew Bible does not mention persimmons, but in the Talmud and Midrash the Hebrew term may also stand for balsam, which occurs once in the Hebrew Bible as Hebrew besami (בְּשָׂמִי) "my spice" in Song of Songs 5:1, which is indirect evidence of the form basam (בָּשָׂם).

In modern Hebrew, the word afarsimon is translated as persimmon. However, some doubt that persimmons would have been known to the peoples of the Bible, although being a traditional Jewish New Year's food in the Diaspora.

According to Adin Steinsaltz, the afarsimon of the 
Talmud was considered very valuable, and worth its weight in gold.

Identification

It is not known exactly what plant was used to produce the biblical oil. According to one theory, it is the plant Commiphora opobalsamum - a small shrub, 10 to 12 feet high, with wandlike, spreading branches. The oil extracted from the seeds or branches of this plant has been used as a medicine, but more commonly as incense or perfumed oil.

Qumran jug
In April 1988, archeologists working with the former Baptist minister Vendyl Jones discovered a small jug of oil in the Qumran region that Jones announced was the oil used in the Temple. The find was announced by the New York Times on February 15, 1989, and a feature article was published in National Geographic Magazine in October of that year. After testing by the Pharmaceutical Department of the Hebrew University of Jerusalem, the substance inside the juglet was claimed by Jones to be the shemen afarsimon hinted at in Psalm 133. According to Jones, it was the first artifact discovered from the First Temple Period, and one of the treasures listed in the Copper Scroll. However, this identification remains controversial.

See also
Balm of Gilead
Balsam of Mecca
Commiphora gileadensis
Holy anointing oil
Perfume

References

Tabernacle and Temples in Jerusalem
Oils
 Perfumes
 Essential oils
Biblical archaeology